Coal Creek Bridge may refer to:

Coal Creek Covered Bridge, formerly listed on the National Register of Historic Places in Parke County, Indiana
Coal Creek Bridge (Carlisle, Iowa), formerly listed on the National Register of Historic Places in Warren County, Iowa